Ucai is a genus of beetles in the longhorn beetle family, Cerambycidae. It was erected in 2009 with the description of a new species from Brazil. A second species was described in 2014.

Species 
The following species are recognised in the genus Ucai:
Ucai letiziae Santos-Silva, 2014
Ucai nascimentoi Galileo and Martins, 2009

References

Prioninae
Fauna of Brazil
Insects of South America